The Navarro Group is a geologic group in Arkansas, Texas and Coahuila, Mexico. It preserves fossils dating back to the Cretaceous period.

See also

 List of fossiliferous stratigraphic units in Arkansas
 Paleontology in Arkansas
 List of fossiliferous stratigraphic units in Texas
 Paleontology in Texas

References

Geologic groups of Arkansas
Geologic groups of Texas
Cretaceous System of North America